Patriarch Nicholas may refer to:

 Nicholas I of Constantinople, Ecumenical Patriarch in 901–907 and 912–925
 Nicholas II of Constantinople, Ecumenical Patriarch in 984–996
 Nicholas III of Constantinople, Ecumenical Patriarch in 1084–1111
 Nicholas IV of Constantinople, Ecumenical Patriarch in 1147–1151
 Patriarch Nicholas I of Alexandria, Greek Patriarch of Alexandria in 1210–1243
 Patriarch Nicholas II of Alexandria, Greek Patriarch of Alexandria in 1263–1276
 Patriarch Nicholas III of Alexandria, Greek Patriarch of Alexandria in 1389–1398
 Patriarch Nicholas IV of Alexandria, Greek Patriarch of Alexandria in 1412–1417
 Nicholas I Zaya, patriarch of the Chaldean Catholic Church in 1839–1847
 Patriarch Nicholas V of Alexandria, Greek Patriarch of Alexandria in 1936–1939
 Patriarch Nicholas VI of Alexandria, Greek Orthodox Patriarch of Alexandria in 1968–1986